The 2009 Esso Cup was Canada's inaugural national women's midget hockey championship, played April 19–25, 2009 at the Max Bell Centre in Calgary, Alberta. The Westman Wildcats from Manitoba defeated the Scarborough Sharks from Ontario to win the first gold medal. The host Calgary Flyers defeated their provincial rival, the Edmonton Thunder, to take the bronze. Calgary's Brittany Styner was named the tournament's most valuable player.

Teams

Note: Quebec did not participate in the first Esso Cup

Round robin

Standings

Scores

 Westman 3 - Edmonton 1
 Calgary 6 - Scarborough 0
 Edmonton 5 - Scarborough 1
 Calgary 6 - Northern 1
 Westman 6 - Northern 0
 Calgary 4 - Edmonton 2
 Scarborough 4 - Northern 2
 Calgary 6 - Westman 3
 Edmonton 5 - Northern 0
 Scarborough 3 - Westman 1

Playoffs

Semi-finals
 Westman 3 - Edmonton 2
 Scarborough 4 - Calgary 2

Bronze-medal game
 Calgary 3 - Edmonton 2

Gold-medal game
 Westman 5 - Scarborough 2

Individual awards
 Most Valuable Player: Brittany Styner (Calgary)
 Top Forward: Brittany Esposito (Edmonton)
 Top Defence: Brigette Lacquette (Westman)
 Top Goaltender: Emily Blakely (Northern)
 Most Sportsmanlike Player: Erin Lally (Calgary)

Road to the Esso Cup

Atlantic Region
Regional Tournament held March 26–29, 2009

Round robin

Championship Game
 Northern 3 - Metro 1
Northern advances to Esso Cup

Quebec
Quebec did not field a team in this year's Esso Cup

Ontario
Ontario Women's Hockey Association Championship held March 27–28, 2009

Semi-finals
 Scarborough 2 – Sudbury 1
 Whitby 2- Saugeen-Maitland 1

Championship Game
 Scarborough 2 - Whitby 1
Scarborough advances to Esso Cup

Western Region
Best-of-3 series played April 3–5, 2009
Prince Albert Bears vs Westman Wildcats
 Game 1: Westman 5 - Prince Albert 2
 Game 2: Westman 2 - Prince Albert 1
Westman wins series and advances to Esso Cup

Pacific Region
Best-of-3 series played April 3–5, 2009
Vancouver Fusion vs Edmonton Thunder
 Game 1: Edmonton 2 - Vancouver 0
 Game 2: Edmonton 2 - Vancouver 0
Edmonton wins series and advances to Esso Cup

See also
 Esso Cup

References

External links
 Hockey Canada

Esso Cup
Esso Cup
Sport in Calgary